Florence Kawa (1912–2008) was an American artist.

Kawa took part in the Works Project Administration’s Federal Art Project in the 1930s. Her work is included in the collections of the Smithsonian American Art Museum, the Franklin D. Roosevelt Presidential Library and Museum, the Madison Museum of Contemporary Art, and the Indianapolis Museum of Art.

References

1912 births
2008 deaths
20th-century American women artists
Federal Art Project artists
Artists from Wisconsin
21st-century American women